Hans Kalb (3 August 1899 – 5 April 1945) was a German international footballer.

International career 
The 1. FC Nürnberg player won 15 caps (two goals) for Germany. Kalb was sent off in the match against Uruguay at the 1928 Olympic Games for a deliberate foul against Uruguayan goal scorer Pedro Petrone. Uruguay won the game 4-1, and Kalb received a one year ban from the German Football Association, which ended his international career.

Personal life
In the First World War he served as an artilleryman in the German Army.

Outside football, Kalb was a dental surgeon who practised in Nuremberg. He died from an infection contracted in surgery.

References

External links
 
 
 
 

1899 births
1945 deaths
Footballers from Nuremberg
Association football defenders
German footballers
Germany international footballers
Olympic footballers of Germany
Footballers at the 1928 Summer Olympics
1. FC Nürnberg players
German Army personnel of World War I